The 42nd Battalion (Royal Highlanders of Canada), CEF, was an infantry battalion of the Canadian Expeditionary Force during the Great War.

History 
The 42nd Battalion was authorized on 7 November 1914 and embarked for Great Britain on 10 June 1915. It disembarked in France on 9 October 1915, where it fought as part of the 7th Canadian Brigade, 3rd Canadian Division in France and Flanders until the end of the war. The battalion was disbanded on 15 September 1920.

The 42nd Battalion recruited in and was mobilized at Montreal.

The 42nd Battalion had five Officers Commanding:
Lt-Col. G.S. Cantlie, 10 June 1915 – 24 December 1916
Maj. R.L.H. Ewing, 24 December 1916 – 2 January 1917
Maj. S.C. Norsworthy, 2 January 1917 – 6 April 1917
Lt-Col. B. McLennan, DSO, 6 April 1917 – 3 August 1918
Lt-Col. R.L.H. Ewing, DSO, MC, 3 August 1918-Demobilization

One member of the 42nd Battalion was awarded the Victoria Cross. Private (later Lieutenant) Thomas Dinesen was awarded the Victoria Cross for his actions on 12 August 1918 at Parvillers, France.

The novelist Will R. Bird was a member of the battalion, and wrote two books of memoirs on his war experiences: And We Go On and Ghosts Have Warm Hands.

Battle Honours 
The 42nd Battalion was awarded the following battle honours:
MOUNT SORREL
SOMME, 1916
Flers-Courcelette
Ancre Heights
ARRAS, 1917, '18
Vimy, 1917
Arleux
HILL 70
Ypres 1917
Passchendaele
AMIENS
SCARPE '18
HINDENBURG LINE
Canal du Nord
PURSUIT TO MONS
FRANCE AND FLANDERS, 1915-18

Perpetuation 
The 42nd Battalion (Royal Highlanders of Canada), CEF, is perpetuated by The Black Watch (Royal Highland Regiment) of Canada.

See also 

 List of infantry battalions in the Canadian Expeditionary Force

References

Sources

Canadian Expeditionary Force 1914-1919 by Col. G.W.L. Nicholson, CD, Queen's Printer, Ottawa, Ontario, 1962

042
Military units and formations of Quebec
Black Watch (Royal Highland Regiment) of Canada